Hohen Neuendorf (in German S-Bahnhof Hohen Neuendorf) is a railway station in the town of Hohen Neuendorf, Germany. It is served by the Berlin S-Bahn and by several local buses.

On 13 August 1961, the S-Bahn line to Oranienburg was cut off by the Berlin Wall, and it was only from Hohen Neuendorf to Oranienburg as a shuttle and a lonely, not connected line. It was only connected on 19 November 1961 to the rest of the East Berlin S-Bahn. The West Berlin section from Hohen Neuendorf to Frohnau was later reconstructed since February 1991 and reopened on 31 May 1992. In addition, the southern exit from Hohen Neuendorf was also closed.

References

External links
Station information 

Berlin S-Bahn stations
Railway stations in Brandenburg
Buildings and structures in Oberhavel
Railway stations in Germany opened in 1877